Jack Laurence "Laurie" Brownlie (25 November 1899 – 8 October 1972) was a New Zealand rugby union player. A loose forward, Brownlie represented  at a provincial level, and was a member of the New Zealand national side, the All Blacks, in 1921. He played just one game for the All Blacks, against New South Wales, and did not appear in any Test matches.

His brothers Cyril and Maurice were both in the 1924-25 tour of Britain by the Invincibles.

References

1899 births
1972 deaths
People educated at St. Patrick's College, Wellington
New Zealand rugby union players
New Zealand international rugby union players
Hawke's Bay rugby union players
Rugby union flankers
Rugby union players from Whanganui